Zebuliah Noland (born August 16, 1997) is a former American football quarterback for the South Carolina Gamecocks. After transferring to South Carolina as a graduate student following time at Iowa State and North Dakota State, he drew media attention upon being added to the Gamecocks' roster and named their starting quarterback despite being a graduate assistant with the team.

Early life
Noland, the son of Travis and Julie Noland, was born in Watkinsville, Georgia. He played high school football at Oconee County High School under his father, a former Appalachian State quarterback. He earned all-region honors twice, and led the team to their first regional championship since 2004. Rated the No. 60 pro-style quarterback in his class by 247Sports, Noland received offers from Toledo, Middle Tennessee, Colorado State, Richmond, FIU, and Appalachian State. He ultimately committed to Appalachian State on June 6, 2015, but later rescinded that commitment upon receiving an offer from Iowa State. He signed a letter of intent and committed to Iowa State on December 21, 2015, and formally enrolled less than a month later.

College career

Iowa State
After sitting out as a redshirt freshman in 2016, Noland saw his first action at Iowa State the following year. He played in four contests for the Cyclones in 2017, including a start in Iowa State's win against Baylor. He saw further game time in 2018, playing in five games for Iowa State. Following the conclusion of the season, Noland transferred to North Dakota State.

North Dakota State
Arriving in Fargo as a redshirt junior, Noland competed for the starting role with Trey Lance and Noah Sanders, ultimately earning the second spot on the depth chart behind Lance. He made eight appearances for the Bison in 2019; North Dakota State would go on to win the national championship that season. Following Lance's departure for the National Football League, Noland ascended to the starting role, and made seven starts for North Dakota State in the spring 2021 season (delayed from fall 2020 due to the COVID-19 pandemic). He led the team in total offense and finished with a 5–2 record as a starter for the Bison.

Head coach Matt Entz announced Noland's departure from the program on April 25, 2021, with Noland reported to have taken a Power Five coaching job.

South Carolina
In May 2021, Noland was hired as a graduate assistant at South Carolina. He received media attention after being added to the roster and promoted to the starting quarterback position, despite being a member of the coaching staff, following an injury to starter Luke Doty in practice. He made his debut for the Gamecocks on September 4, 2021, throwing for 121 yards and four touchdowns in South Carolina's 46–0 season-opening win against Eastern Illinois.

College statistics

Personal life
Noland holds a degree in university studies from North Dakota State University, graduating in December 2019.

References

1997 births
Living people
American football quarterbacks
Iowa State Cyclones football players
North Dakota State Bison football players
South Carolina Gamecocks football coaches
South Carolina Gamecocks football players
People from Watkinsville, Georgia
Players of American football from Georgia (U.S. state)
21st-century American people